Malcolm Lake (born 3 August 1994) is a Zimbabwean first-class cricketer. He was part of Zimbabwe's squad for the 2014 ICC Under-19 Cricket World Cup. In March 2017, he played for Oxford MCCU against Surrey as part of the Marylebone Cricket Club University fixtures.

References

External links
 

1994 births
Living people
Zimbabwean cricketers
Oxford MCCU cricketers
Sportspeople from Harare
Alumni of Oxford Brookes University